Gregory Roy Parks (March 25, 1967 – June 16, 2015) was a Canadian professional ice hockey player. He won a silver medal at the 1994 Winter Olympics.  He would also play 23 games in the National Hockey League with the New York Islanders.

Awards and honours

Career statistics

Regular season and playoffs

International

References

External links

 Obituary

1967 births
2015 deaths
IF Björklöven players
Bowling Green Falcons men's ice hockey players
Brynäs IF players
Capital District Islanders players
HC Fribourg-Gottéron players
Ice hockey players at the 1994 Winter Olympics
Johnstown Chiefs players
Krefeld Pinguine players
Leksands IF players
Medalists at the 1994 Winter Olympics
New York Islanders players
Oji Eagles players
Olympic ice hockey players of Canada
Olympic medalists in ice hockey
Olympic silver medalists for Canada
Oulun Kärpät players
St. Albert Saints players
SC Langnau players
Ice hockey people from Edmonton
Springfield Indians players
Undrafted National Hockey League players
Canadian expatriate ice hockey players in Germany
Canadian expatriate ice hockey players in Switzerland
Canadian expatriate ice hockey players in Sweden
Canadian expatriate ice hockey players in the United States
Canadian ice hockey right wingers
AHCA Division I men's ice hockey All-Americans